BDF F.C. may refer to:

 Barbados Defence Force FC
 Belize Defence Force FC